The following is the 1965–66 network television schedule for the three major English language commercial broadcast networks in the United States. The schedule covers primetime hours from September 1965 through August 1966. The schedule is followed by a list per network of returning series, new series, and series cancelled after the 1964–65 season.

This season, ABC and CBS began televising a majority of their prime-time programs in color, while almost all of NBC's fall schedule was in color, with the exception of the war drama Convoy and the sitcom I Dream of Jeannie, with the former being canned after 13 episodes and the latter moving to color the following season. As most of the primetime programming was made in color, this season's schedule indicates the remaining black-and-white content with a "(B/W)" indicative.

New series are highlighted in bold while endings are highlighted in italics.

Each of the 30 highest-rated shows is listed with its rank and rating as determined by Nielsen Media Research.

 Yellow indicates the programs in the top 10 for the season.
 Cyan indicates the programs in the top 20 for the season.
 Magenta indicates the programs in the top 30 for the season.

Schedule

Sunday

Monday 

Note: Art Linkletter's Hollywood Talent Scouts replaced The Steve Lawrence Show in December. The Avengers replaced Ben Casey in March.

Tuesday

Wednesday 

* formerly Burke's Law

Thursday

Friday 

Note: The Farmer's Daughter took over the 9:30–10 time period on ABC, effective November 5, because many viewers were not home to watch Peyton Place on Fridays. Starting November 1, Peyton Place was seen Monday, Tuesday, and Thursday. In the winter of 1966, The Sammy Davis, Jr. Show replaced Convoy on its timeslot, which was transmitted live in color.

Saturday 

Note: Even though ABC Scope was scheduled at 10:30 PM, not one major station (including WABC-TV New York, the network's flagship station) carried it in that time period, preferring to schedule local or syndicated programming in its place. Most affiliates aired it in "fringe time" during the weekend.

By network

ABC

Returning Series
12 O'Clock High
ABC Monday Night Movie
ABC Scope
The ABC Sunday Night Movie
The Addam's Family
The Adventures of Ozzie and Harriet
Amos Burke — Secret Agent
The Avengers
Ben Casey
Bewitched
Combat!
The Donna Reed Show
The Farmer's Daughter
The Flintstones
The Fugitive
The Hollywood Palace
The Jimmy Dean Show
The King Family Show
The Lawrence Welk Show
McHale's Navy
The Patty Duke Show
Peyton Place
Saga of Western Man
Shindig!
Voyage to the Bottom of the Sea

New Series
The Baron
Batman *
The Big Valley
Blue Light *
Court Martial *
The Double Life of Henry Phyfe *
F Troop
The F.B.I.
Gidget
Honey West
The Legend of Jesse James
The Long Hot Summer
A Man Called Shenandoah
O.K. Crackerby!
Tammy

Not returning from 1964–65:
The Bing Crosby Show
Broadside
F.D.R.
Jonny Quest
Mickey
My Three Sons (moved to CBS)
No Time for Sergeants
The Outer Limits
The Tycoon
Valentine's Day
Wagon Train
Wendy and Me

CBS

Returning Series
The Andy Griffith Show
The Beverly Hillbillies
Candid Camera
CBS News Hour
CBS Reports
The Danny Kaye Show
The Dick Van Dyke Show
The Ed Sullivan Show
Gilligan's Island
Gomer Pyle, U.S.M.C.
Gunsmoke
Hazel (moved from NBC)
I've Got a Secret
The Jackie Gleason Show
Lassie
The Lucy Show
The Munsters
My Favorite Martian
My Three Sons (moved from ABC)
Perry Mason
Petticoat Junction
Rawhide
The Red Skelton Hour
Secret Agent
Slattery's People
To Tell the Truth
The Twentieth Century
Vacation Playhouse
What's My Line?

New Series
Art Linkletter's Hollywood Talent Scouts
CBS Thursday Night Movie
Continental Showcase
Daktari *
The Face Is Familiar *
Green Acres
The Hippodrome *
Hogan's Heroes
The John Gary Show *
The Loner
Lost in Space
The Smothers Brothers Comedy Hour
The Smothers Brothers Summer Show *
The Steve Lawrence Show
The Trials of O'Brien
Wayne & Shuster Take An Affectionate Look At... *
The Wild Wild West

Not returning from 1964–65:
The Baileys of Balboa
The Cara Williams Show
The Celebrity Game
The Defenders
The Doctors and the Nurses
The Entertainers
Fanfare
For the People
Glynis
The Great Adventure
Hullabaloo
The Joey Bishop Show
Many Happy Returns
Mr. Broadway
Mister Ed
My Living Doll
On Broadway Tonight
Our Private World
Password
The Reporter
Summer Playhouse
World War One

NBC

Returning Series
Actuality Specials
The Andy Williams Show
The Bell Telephone Hour
Bob Hope Presents the Chrysler Theatre
Bonanza
Branded
Daniel Boone
Dr. Kildare
Flipper
The Man from U.N.C.L.E.
NBC Saturday Night at the Movies
Perry Como's Kraft Music Hall
The Virginian
Walt Disney's Wonderful World of Color

New Series
Camp Runamuck
Convoy
The Dean Martin Show
The Dean Martin Summer Show *
Get Smart
Hank
I Dream of Jeannie
I Spy
The John Forsythe Show
Laredo
Mickie Finn's *
Mister Roberts
Mona McCluskey
My Mother the Car
Please Don't Eat the Daisies
Run for Your Life
The Sammy Davis Jr. Show *
The Wackiest Ship in the Army

Not returning from 1964–65:
90 Bristol Court
The Alfred Hitchcock Hour
The Bill Dana Show
Cloak of Mystery
The Famous Adventures of Mr. Magoo
Harris Against the World
Hazel (moved to CBS)
International Showtime
The Jack Benny Program
The Jack Paar Program
Kentucky Jones
Kraft Suspense Theater
Mr. Novak
Moment of Fear
Profiles in Courage
The Rogues
Tom, Dick and Mary

Note: The * indicates that the program was introduced in midseason.

References

Additional sources
 Castleman, H. & Podrazik, W. (1982). Watching TV: Four Decades of American Television. New York: McGraw-Hill. 314 pp.
 McNeil, Alex. Total Television. Fourth edition. New York: Penguin Books. .
 Brooks, Tim & Marsh, Earle (2007). The Complete Directory to Prime Time Network and Cable TV Shows (9th ed.). New York: Ballantine. .

United States primetime network television schedules
1965 in American television
1966 in American television